Beginning with the 9th Congress, Tennessee was divided into 3 districts.

See also 
 United States House of Representatives elections, 1804 and 1805
 List of United States representatives from Tennessee

1805
Tennessee
United States House of Representatives